HD 83953 (I Hydrae) is a single, blue-white hued star in the equatorial constellation of Hydra. It is visible to the naked eye, having an apparent visual magnitude of 4.76. It is moving further from Earth with a heliocentric radial velocity of +16 km/s.

This is a B-type main-sequence star with a stellar classification of B5 V. It has been known to be a Be star since 1926, when an Hβ emission line was discovered in the stellar spectrum by Mount Wilson Observatory. This energy is coming from a circumstellar envelope of heated gas that has been expelled from the central star and formed a thin orbiting disk. HD 83953 is spinning rapidly with a projected rotational velocity of 315 km/s, giving the star an oblate shape with an equatorial bulge that is 18% larger than the polar radius.

HD 83953 has 4.6 times the mass of the Sun and 4.0 times the Sun's radius. It is radiating 708 times the Sun's luminosity from its photosphere at an effective temperature of 15,000 K.

References

B-type main-sequence stars
Be stars
Hydra (constellation)
Hydrae, l
Durchmusterung objects
083953
047522
3858